Gnudi are gnocchi-like dumplings made with ricotta cheese instead of potato, with semolina. The result is often a lighter, "pillowy" dish, unlike the often denser, chewier gnocchi. Gnudi is the Tuscan word for "naked" (in standard Italian "nudi"), the idea being that these "pillowy" balls of ricotta and spinach (sometimes without spinach, which is also known as ricotta gnocchi) are "nude ravioli", consisting of just the tasty filling without the pasta shell. By tradition, in Tuscany, these dumplings are served with burnt butter and sage sauce, sprinkled with Parmigiano or Pecorino Toscano cheese.

In Italy, outside of Tuscany, they are also sometimes called "strangolapreti" (priest choker), “malfatti” (badly made) or simply "gnocchi di ricotta e spinaci" (ricotta and spinach gnocchi).

Gnudi became a popular dish in the US after a special version was served at The Spotted Pig restaurant in New York City.

References 

Dumplings
Cheese dishes
Italian cuisine
Vegetarian cuisine